Cambiogenplasmid, marketed as Neovasculgen, is a gene therapy drug for treatment of peripheral artery disease, including critical limb ischemia; it delivers the gene encoding for vascular endothelial growth factor (VEGF). Neovasculogen is a plasmid encoding the CMV promoter and the 165 amino acid form of VEGF. It was developed by the Human Stem Cells Institute in Russia and approved in Russia in 2011.

References

See also 
 Therapeutic angiogenesis

Gene therapy